Zao may refer to:
 Mayor Zao, a character in the video game Freedom Planet
 Zao (American band), a metalcore band from West Virginia 
 Zao (French band)
 Mount Zaō, a mountain in northern Japan
 Zaō, Miyagi, a town in Japan
 5751 Zao, an asteroid
 ZAO, an abbreviation for a Russian closed joint-stock company
 Zao Wou-Ki (1920-2013), Chinese-French contemporary painter
 ZAO, a free Chinese Deepfake app
 Captain Zao, Chinese submarine officer in Fallout 4
 Zao, evil North Korean military officer in Die Another Day